Sułtańska Woda is a river of Poland, a tributary of the Kłobucki Potok.

References

Rivers of Poland